Zahomce is a dispersed settlement in the hills south of Vransko in central Slovenia. The area is included in the Savinja Statistical Region and was traditionally part of Lower Styria.

References

External links
Zahomce at Geopedia

Populated places in the Municipality of Vransko